Stella Stevens (born Estelle Caro Eggleston; October 1, 1938 – February 17, 2023) was an American actress and model. 

Stevens began her acting career in 1959 in film Say One for Me produced by and starring Bing Crosby and appeared in TV series such as the anthology series  Alfred Hitchcock Presents, General Electric Theatre and Bonanza in 1960. She won the 1960 Golden Globe Award - for "New Star of the Year". 

That year she appeared in three Playboy Pictorials and was named Playmate of the Month for January 1960.

She starred in films such as Girls! Girls! Girls! (1962), The Nutty Professor (1963), The Courtship of Eddie's Father (1963), The Silencers (1966), Where Angels Go, Trouble Follows (1968), The Ballad of Cable Hogue (1970), and The Poseidon Adventure (1972).

Stevens subsequently focused more on TV roles, miniseries, and movies including roles in Wonder Woman, The Love Boat (1977, 1983), Hart to Hart (1979), Newhart (1983), Murder, She Wrote (1985), Magnum, P.I. (1986), Highlander: The Series (1995), and Twenty Good Years (2006). 

Stevens worked also as film producer, director, and writer.

Early life
Born Estelle Caro Eggleston on October 1, 1938, in Yazoo City, Mississippi, she was the only child of Thomas Ellett Eggleston, an insurance salesman, and his wife, Estelle (née Caro) Eggleston, a nurse who was sometimes called by the nickname "Dovey". 
 One of the younger Estelle Eggleston's great-grandfathers was Henry Clay Tyler, an early settler from Boston and a jeweler who gave the Yazoo City courthouse cupola its clock.

When Stella Stevens was four, her parents moved to Memphis, Tennessee; they lived on Carrington Road, near Highland Street, in the city. She attended St. Anne's Catholic School which is on Highland Street and Sacred Heart School on Jefferson Avenue graduating from high school in 1955 at the Memphis Evening School at Memphis Tech High School.

At age 16, she married electrician Noble Herman Stephens, on December 3, 1954, in Holly Springs, Mississippi. They moved to Memphis, where their only child, Herman Andrew Stephens was born on June 10, 1955. The couple divorced in 1957.

While studying at Memphis State University, Stella became interested in acting and modeling. According to her official biography, "Her schooling in Memphis, included a couple of years at Memphis State University, where she was noticed in the school play Bus Stop. The Memphis Press-Scimitar review of that performance in Memphis sparked her career."

Film career

Stevens made her film debut in Say One for Me (1959), a modest musical produced by and starring Bing Crosby, appearing in the minor role of a chorus girl. Stevens' contract with 20th Century-Fox was dropped after six months. After winning the role of Appassionata Von Climax in the musical Li'l Abner (1959), she signed a contract with Paramount Pictures (1959-1963). In 1960, she won the Golden Globe Award for New Star of the Year – Actress for her performance in Say One for Me, sharing the distinction with fellow up-and-comers Tuesday Weld, Angie Dickinson, and Janet Munro.

In 1961, she starred opposite Bobby Darin in John Cassavetes' Too Late Blues, and in 1962, she starred opposite Elvis Presley in Girls! Girls! Girls!. 

The following year in 1963 she appeared in two successful comedy films: The Nutty Professor starring comedian Jerry Lewis, where she play's his student and love interest Stella Purdy, and in Vincente Minnelli's The Courtship of Eddie's Father, playing the would-be "Miss Montana" beauty queen.

In 1964, she signed a four-year contract with Columbia Pictures. Following appearances in Synanon (1965) and The Secret of My Success (1965), Stevens starred as a sexy but clumsy government agent opposite Dean Martin in the Matt Helm spy spoof The Silencers (1966). Her last film for Columbia was Where Angels Go, Trouble Follows (1968) in which she played Sister George.

In 1970, Stevens starred opposite Jason Robards in Sam Peckinpah's The Ballad of Cable Hogue, for which she received positive reviews. In his review in The New York Times, Roger Greenspun wrote, "But it is Stella Stevens, at last in a role good enough for her, who most wonderfully sustains and enlightens the action." In 1972, she co-starred with Jim Brown in the blaxploitation movie Slaughter, later in the year costarring in Irwin Allen's hugely successful disaster film The Poseidon Adventure, starring Gene Hackman, Ernest Borgnine, Roddy McDowall, and Shelley Winters. Stevens played the role of Linda Rogo, the "refreshingly outspoken" ex-prostitute wife of Borgnine's character. In 1986, she appeared in Monster in the Closet.

Although she continued to appear in feature films for the next four decades, Stevens shifted the focus of her career to television series, miniseries, and telemovies.

Television career

Stevens appeared in several top television series in the 1960s, including Alfred Hitchcock Presents (1960), General Electric Theater (1960, 1961), and Ben Casey (1964). One of her earliest television appearances was in a critically acclaimed 1960 episode of Bonanza, "Silent Thunder"; she played a deaf-mute.

In the early 1970s, she began working regularly on television series, miniseries, and movies. She appeared in episodes of popular series like Banacek (1973) and Police Story (1975), as well as the pilot films for Wonder Woman (1975), The Love Boat (1977), and Hart to Hart (1979). In 1979, she appeared along with her son Andrew Stevens in The Oregon Trail (1977) episode "Hannah's Girl".

During the 1980s, she continued to work regularly on series including Newhart (1983), The Love Boat (1983), Fantasy Island (1983), Highway to Heaven (1984), Night Court (1984), Murder, She Wrote (1985), Magnum, P.I. (1986), and Father Dowling Mysteries (1987). Stevens appears in 34 episodes of the primetime soap opera Flamingo Road (1981–82), as Lute-Mae Sanders, the former madam of a brothel. During a 1988 interview she commented on her role as a madam in Flamingo Road, saying that, "The truth of the matter is that I've always been type cast, but I don't mind because hookers are among the few roles that require glamorous wardrobes, feathers and jewelry."

From 1989 to 1990, she had a role on Santa Barbara as Phyllis Blake. Her string of appearances on popular television series continued into the 1990s with The Commish (1993), Burke's Law (1994), Highlander: The Series (1995), Silk Stalkings (1996), and General Hospital (1996, 1999). She also appeared in the critically acclaimed miniseries In Cold Blood (1996).

Additional work
In January 1960, she was Playboy magazine's Playmate of the Month and was also featured in Playboy pictorials in 1965 and 1968. She was included in Playboys 100 Sexiest Stars of the 20th Century, appearing at number 27. During the 1960s, she was one of the most photographed women in the world.

Speaking to her Playboy features, Stevens told The New York Times, "If you've got ten million people seeing you in a layout like that ... and half of them remember the name 'Stella Stevens', they'll buy tickets for your movies."

In the 1960s, Stevens was a member of a five-voice vocal ensemble called The Skip-Jacks. The group is best known for performing the theme songs for the television programs The Flintstones and The Patty Duke Show.

Stevens appeared in several stage productions, including a touring production of an all-female version of Neil Simon's The Odd Couple opposite Sandy Dennis. Stevens played the Oscar Madison character. She directed the feature film, The Ranch (1989) and  produced and directed The American Heroine (1979). In 1999, she co-wrote a novel, Razzle Dazzle, about a Memphis-born singer named Johnny Gault.

Personal life
Stevens was married to Noble Herman Stephens from 1954 until their divorce in 1957. Their son Andrew was born in 1955. Following her divorce she changed the spelling of her last name to 'Stevens' and left her son in the custody of her parents while she sought out a successful acting career. In the years following, she and her former husband engaged in a custody battle for their son, with each party accusing the other of kidnapping, before Stevens finally won full custody.

In late 1976, Stevens purchased a ranch in Methow Valley near Carlton, Washington on the eastern edge of the Cascade Mountains. She also opened an art gallery and bakery in the nearby small town of Twisp, Washington.

In 1983, Stevens began a long-term relationship with rock guitarist Bob Kulick. A little over a year later, he moved into Stevens' Beverly Hills home. In March 2016, Kulick and Stevens sold her longtime Beverly Hills home, and she moved to a long-term Alzheimer's care facility in Los Angeles. Kulick often visited her there until his death on May 28, 2020.

Death
Stevens died of complications from Alzheimer's disease in Los Angeles on February 17, 2023, at the age of 84.

Filmography

Films

 Say One for Me (1959) as Chorine
 The Blue Angel (1959) as Chorus Girl (uncredited)
 Li'l Abner (1959) as Appassionata Von Climax
 Man-Trap (1961) as Nina Jameson
 Too Late Blues (1961) as Jess Polanski
 Girls! Girls! Girls! (1962) as Robin Gantner
 The Courtship of Eddie's Father (1963) as Dollye Daly
 The Nutty Professor (1963) as Stella Purdy
 Advance to the Rear (1964) as Martha Lou Williams
 Synanon (1965) as Joaney Adamic
 The Secret of My Success (1966) as Violet Lawson
 The Silencers (1966) as Gail Hendricks
 Rage (1966) as Perla
 How to Save a Marriage and Ruin Your Life (1968) as Carol Corman
 Sol Madrid (1968) as Stacey Woodward 
 Where Angels Go, Trouble Follows (1968) as Sister George
 The Mad Room (1969) as Ellen Hardy
 The Ballad of Cable Hogue (1970) as Hildy
 A Town Called Bastard (1971) as Alvira
 Stand Up and Be Counted (1972) as Yvonne Kellerman
 Slaughter (1972) as Ann
 The Poseidon Adventure (1972) as Linda Rogo
 Arnold (1973) as Karen
 Las Vegas Lady (1975) as Lucky
 Cleopatra Jones and the Casino of Gold (1975) as Bianca Javin / Dragon Lady
 Nickelodeon (1976) as Screen Queen
 The Manitou (1978) as Amelia Crusoe
 Wacko (1982) as Mrs. Doctor Graves
 Mister Deathman (1983) as Liz
 Ladies Night (1983) as Shelly
 Chained Heat (1983) as Captain Taylor
 The Longshot (1986) as Nicki Dixon
 Monster in the Closet (1986) as Margo
 Down the Drain (1990) as Sophia
 Mom (1990) as Beverly Hills
 The Terror Within II (1991) as Kara
 Last Call (1991) as Betty
 The Nutt House (1992) as Mrs. Robinson
 Exiled in America (1992) as Sonny Moore
 South Beach (1992) as Nancy
 Little Devils: The Birth (1993) as Mrs. Clara Madison
 Eye of the Stranger (1993) as Doc
 Hard Drive (1994) as Susan
 Point of Seduction: Body Chemistry III (1994, Video) as Frannie Sibley
 Molly & Gina (1994) as Mrs. Sweeny
 Illicit Dreams (1995) as Cicily
 The Granny (1995, Video) as Granny
 Body Chemistry 4: Full Exposure (1995, Video) as Fran Sibley
 Star Hunter (1995, Video) as Mrs. March
 Virtual Combat (1996, Video) as Mary
 Invisible Mom (1996, Video) as Mrs. Herbert Pringle
 Bikini Hotel (1997) as Gail Regent
 Size 'Em Up (2001)
 The Long Ride Home (2003) as Fiona Champyon
 Blessed (2004) as Betty
 Glass Trap (2005) as Joan Highsmith
 Hell to Pay (2005) as Mary Potter
 Popstar (2005) as Henrietta
 Megaconda (2010) as Mary Jane, (final film role)

Television

 Alfred Hitchcock Presents (1960, Episode: "Craig's Will") as Judy
 Johnny Ringo (1960, Episode: "Uncertain Vengeance") as Suzanne Crale
 Hawaiian Eye (1960, Episode: "Kakua Woman") as Carol Judd
 Bonanza (1960, Episode: "Silent Thunder") as Ann 'Annie' Croft
 Riverboat (1960, Episode: "Zigzag") as Lisa Walters
 General Electric Theater (1960, Episode: "The Graduation Dress") as Laura Jericho
 General Electric Theater (1961, Episode: "The Great Alberti") as May Alberti
 Follow the Sun (1961, Episode: "Conspiracy of Silence") as Linda Laurence
 Frontier Circus (1962, Episode: "The Balloon Girl") as Katy Cogswell
 Ben Casey (1964, 2 episodes) as Jane Hancock
 In Broad Daylight (1971, TV Movie) as Elizabeth Chappel
 Ghost Story (1972, Episode: "The Dead We Leave Behind") as Joanna Brent
 Hec Ramsey (1972, Episode: "Hangman's Wages") as Ivy Turnwright
 Climb an Angry Mountain (1972, TV Movie) as Sheila Chilko
 Banacek (1973, Episode: "Ten Thousand Dollars a Page") as Jill Hammond
 Linda (1973, TV Movie) as Linda Reston
 Honky Tonk (1974, TV Movie) as Gold Dust
 The Day the Earth Moved (1974, TV Movie) as Kate Barker
 Police Story (1975, Episode: "The Losing Game") as Margaret Case
 Wonder Woman (1975, TV pilot The New Original Wonder Woman as Marcia
 Kiss Me, Kill Me (1976, TV Movie) as Stella Stafford
 Wanted: The Sundance Woman (1976, TV Movie) as Lola Wilkins
 The Love Boat (1977, TV movie, pilot)
 Charlie Cobb: Nice Night for a Hanging (1977, TV Movie) as Martha McVea
 Murder in Peyton Place (1977, TV Movie) as Stella Chernak
 The Night They Took Miss Beautiful (1977, TV Movie) as Kate Malloy
 The Oregon Trail (1977, Episode: "Hannah's Girl", appears with her son, Andrew Stevens) as Hannah Morgan
 The Eddie Capra Mysteries (1978, 1 episode)
 The Jordan Chance (1978, TV Movie) as Verna Stewart
 Friendships, Secrets and Lies (1979, TV Movie) as Edyth
 Hart to Hart (1979, Episode: "Express to Terror") as Dr. Fleming
 The French Atlantic Affair (1979), miniseries
 Make Me an Offer (1980, TV Movie) as Deidre Price
 Flamingo Road (1980–1982, 34 episodes) as Lute-Mae Sanders
 Children of Divorce (1980, TV Movie) as Sherry Malik
 Twirl (1981, TV Movie) as Carolyn Moore
 Matt Houston (1983, Episode: "Whose Party Is It Anyway?") as Clover McKenna
 The Love Boat (1983, 3 episodes) as Toni Cooper / Kathy Costello / Leonara Klopman
 Women of San Quentin (1983, TV Movie) as Lt. Janet Alexander
 Newhart (1983, 2 episodes) as Erica Chase
 Fantasy Island (1983, 2 episodes) as Marion Sommers / Maatira
 Amazons (1984, TV Movie) as Kathryn Lundquist
 No Man's Land (1984, TV Movie) as Nellie Wilder
 Hotel (1984, Episode: "Flesh and Blood") as Rita DeLaine
 Highway to Heaven (1984, Episode: "Help Wanted: Angel") as Stella
 Night Court (1984, Episode: "Harry and the Madam") as Irene Danbury
 Murder, She Wrote (1985, Episode: "Funeral at Fifty-Mile") as Sally Mestin
 A Masterpiece of Murder (1986, TV Movie) as Della Vance / Deb Potts
 Magnum, P.I. (1986, Episode: "Find Me a Rainbow") as Loretta "Lolly" Zachary van der Post
 The History of White People in America: Volume II (1986, TV Movie)
 Tales from the Hollywood Hills: Natica Jackson (1987, TV Movie) as Mimi Carteret
 Adventures Beyond Belief (1987, TV Movie) as Mrs. Loretta Kemble
 Tales from the Hollywood Hills: A Table at Ciro's (1987, TV Movie) as Mimi Carteret
 Father Dowling Mysteries (1987, "Fatal Confession") as Katherine 'Kate' St. Urban
 Man Against the Mob (1988, TV Movie) as Joey Day
 Alfred Hitchcock Presents (1988, Episode: "Twist") as Georgia Brooks
 Jake Spanner, Private Eye (1989, TV Movie) as Sandra Summers
 Santa Barbara (1989–1990, 66 episodes) as Phyllis Blake
 Dream On (1990, Episode: "Over Your Dead Body") as Lyla Murphy
 In the Heat of the Night (1991, Episode: "A Woman Much Admired") as Georgia Farren
 Dangerous Curves (1992, Episode: "In the Name of Love") as Muffy Fuller
 The Commish (1993, Episode: "Eastbridge Boulevard") as Donna DeVries
 Burke's Law (1994, Episode: "Who Killed the Romance?") as Candice Collier
 Attack of the 5 Ft. 2 In. Women (1994, TV Movie) as Lawanda
 Highlander: The Series (1995, Episode: "Vendetta") as Margaret Lang
 Dave's World (1995, Episode: "The Mommies") as Dave's Mother
 Subliminal Seduction (1996, TV Movie) as Mrs. Beecham
 Renegade (1996, Episode: "Love Hurts") as Amanda Sixkiller
 Arli$$ (1996, Episode: "What About the Fans?") as Flora Lansing
 Silk Stalkings (1996, Episode: "When She Was Bad") as Mrs. Morton
 In Cold Blood (1996, 2 episodes) as Hotel Keeper
 General Hospital (1996-1999)
 The Dukes of Hazzard: Reunion! (1997, TV Movie) as Josephine 'Mama Jo' Max
 Nash Bridges (1997, Episode: "Deliverance") as Suzie Dupree
 The Christmas List (1997, TV Movie) as Natalie Parris
 Viper (1998, Episode: "The Getaway") as Lorraine
 By Dawn's Early Light (2000, TV Movie) as Eli
 Strip Mall (2001, 5 episodes) as Doreen Krudup
 Twenty Good Years (2006, Episode: "The Crying Game") as Martha

As director
 The American Heroine (1979)
 The Ranch (1989)

See also
 List of people in Playboy 1960–1969

References

External links

  for Stella Stevens
 
 
 
 
 

1938 births
2023 deaths
Actresses from Mississippi
Actresses from Memphis, Tennessee
American film actresses
Film producers from Tennessee
American stage actresses
American television actresses
People from Yazoo City, Mississippi
1960s Playboy Playmates
University of Memphis alumni
Film directors from Tennessee
Film directors from Mississippi
20th Century Studios contract players
American women film directors
People from Okanogan County, Washington
Film directors from Washington (state)
American women film producers
Film producers from Washington (state)
New Star of the Year (Actress) Golden Globe winners
Deaths from dementia in California
Deaths from Alzheimer's disease